Careless Love is a 2012 Australian drama film written and directed by John Duigan. The story centers on a university student who secretly works as an escort.

It was Duigan's first movie in Australia for a number of years. It was made entirely with private finance and took 30 days to shoot.

Cast 

 Nammi Le as Linh
 Penny McNamee as Carol
 Ivy Mak as Mint
 David Field as Dion
 Hugo Johnstone-Burt as Seb
 Yukata Izumihara as Masahiko, Japanese client
 John Duigan as University Lecturer
 Jeff Truman as Client with Dog
 Peter O'Brien as Luke

References

External links
 
 Official website
 Careless Love at Urban Cinefile

Australian drama films
2012 films
Films directed by John Duigan
2010s English-language films
2010s Australian films